Christian Gottlob Langwagen (1752, Dresden - 13 August 1805, Braunschweig) was a German architect who served as a Master Builder for the Duchy of Brunswick-Lüneburg).

Life and work 
He was originally a stonecutter, presumably from a poor background. Sometime in the 1770s, he was able to study copper engraving at the Dresden Academy of Fine Arts. There, he developed an interest in architecture and became a student of the Court Architect, Friedrich August Krubsacius.

Duke Charles William Ferdinand called him to the Royal Seat in 1777 and appointed him Court Architect. Later, he went on study trips to Berlin, Hamburg, and throughout rural Germany. He was also the first Chief Civil Engineer in the Duchy; serving until 1803, when he retired and was succeeded by Peter Joseph Krahe.

Most of the buildings he worked on personally have been demolished or destroyed. The  (Long Bridge, 1788 to 1791), in south Braunschweig, was demolished in 1879 during work on a canal. 

Two outbuildings from the 1780s, at Schloss Richmond, have been preserved. Outside of Braunschweig, he created several schools, townhouses and industrial buildings, which have largely not survived.

References

Further reading 
 Norman-Mathias Pingel: "Langwagen, Christian Gottlob". In: Luitgard Camerer, Manfred Garzmann, Wolf-Dieter Schuegraf (Eds.): Braunschweiger Stadtlexikon. Joh. Heinr. Meyer Verlag, Braunschweig 1992, pg.141.
 Horst-Rüdiger Jarck, Günter Scheel (Eds.): Braunschweigisches Biographisches Lexikon – 19. und 20. Jahrhundert. Hahnsche Buchhandlung, Hannover 1996, pg.370.
 Horst-Rüdiger Jarck, Gerhard Schildt (Eds.): Die Braunschweigische Landesgeschichte. Jahrtausendrückblick einer Region. 2nd edition. Appelhans Verlag, Braunschweig 2001,

External links 

 Langwagen, Christian Gottlieb 1753–1805. or Langwagen, Christian Gottlieb. @ WorldCat
 Landschaftsgebäude, Braunschweig, An der Martinikirche 8, von Christian Gottlieb Langwagen. @ Bildindex

1752 births
1805 deaths
Year of birth uncertain

19th-century German architects
Architects from Dresden
18th-century German architects